Huế University is a public, research-oriented university located in Huế, the former imperial capital of Vietnam; it is one of the important regional universities of Vietnam. In Vietnam, universities are classified into three classes: national university (Vietnam National University, Ho Chi Minh City, Vietnam National University, Hanoi), regional university (Thái Nguyên University, The University of Da Nang and Hue University) and university.

History
Hue University, formerly known as The University of Huế, was initially established in March 1957. After the reunification of the country in 1975, independent universities were established in Hue on the basis of the existing faculties of The University of Hue. According to the Government Decree No. 30/ND-CP dated 4 April 1994, Hue University has been re-established by reorganizing all Hue-based universities. Hue University is responsible for training students at undergraduate and postgraduate levels, conducting research and applying science and technology in a multitude of disciplines to serve the construction and development of the country in general and Central Vietnam and Western Highlands in particular.

Organization structure 
 University Council
 Science and Education Council
 Council for Information Technology applications
 Council for Quality Assurance
 Academic member colleges and schools
 University of Sciences, Hue University
 University of Education, Hue University
 University of Agriculture and Forestry, Hue University
 University of Medicine and Pharmacy, Hue University
 University of Arts, Hue University
 University of Economics, Hue University
 University of Foreign Languages, Hue University
 University of Law, Hue University
 School of Tourism and Hospitality
 School of Physical Education
International School
School of Engineering and Technology
 Huế University Quang Tri Branch
 Administrative departments
Office for university administration
Academic Affairs
Science, Technology and International Relations
Planning and Finance
Personnel and Organisation
Student Relations
Facility Management
Testing
Legalism
Inspection 
 Centers
Center for Educational QA
Institute for Bio Technology
Institute for Natural Resources and Environment
Center for International Education
Center for Incubation and Tech Transfer
Distance Education Center
Learning Resource Centre
ICT Center
Student Service Center
National Defence Education Center

Rankings 

QS World University Rankings ranked Huế University in the 451-500 band of top universities in Asia and 6th in Vietnam for 2019.

See also 
 List of universities in Vietnam

References 

 http://hueuni.edu.vn/portal/en/index.php/Unit/Index.html

External links 
Huế University

Huế University